Ptilophyllodromia is a genus of flies in the family Empididae.

Species
P. biroi Bezzi, 1904

References

Empidoidea genera
Empididae
Diptera of Australasia
Taxa named by Mario Bezzi